The coat of arms of the Western Cape is the official  heraldic symbol of the Western Cape province of the Republic of South Africa.  It has been in use since 1998.

History

The Western Cape is one of the three provinces into which the former Cape Province was divided in 1994.  It consists of the western and southern districts of the former province.

Blazon

The  arms were designed by the State Herald, Frederick Brownell, adopted by the provincial legislature, and registered at the Bureau of Heraldry in 1998.  The official blazon is:

 Argent, on a  pile embowed inverted throughout  Azure, a Khoi clay pot with a conical base and two horizontally pierced lugs, Or, between in chief  dexter an anchor Gules and sinister a bunch of grapes slipped and leaved proper.
 The  shield ensigned of a coronet comprising a circlet Or, embellished of beadwork indented Gules and Azure heightened of six protea flowers Or, seeded Argent alternating with as many  annulets, Or.
  Supporters: Dexter a quagga (Equus quagga quagga) and sinister a bontebok (Damasileus dorcas dorcas) proper.
 Special compartment: A stylised representation of Table Mountain Azure, bearing a riband with the fold-backs in the form of two ostrich feathers, Or.
 Motto: SPES BONA (Good Hope).

Blue and white are the colours of the Western Cape;  the anchor alludes to the old name of 'Cape of Good Hope', the grapes refer to agriculture, and the clay pot to the Khoi, who have lived in the region for thousands of years.

See also
 Coat of arms of the Cape Colony
 Coat of arms of Natal
 Coat of arms of the Orange Free State
 Coat of arms of the Orange River Colony
 Coat of arms of South Africa
 Coat of arms of the Transvaal

References

External links
Policy and Law Online description
Flags of the World description
 South African Heraldry Website

Western Cape
South African culture
South African heraldry
Western Cape
Western Cape
Western Cape
Western Cape
Western Cape
Western Cape